Anatoliy Kutsev  (20 April 1959 – 26 June 2016) was a Ukrainian football player and manager.

Career
Kutsev began his playing career with FC Dnipro Dnipropetrovsk in the Soviet Top League before moving to several other clubs including FC Nistru Chişinău and FC CSKA Kyiv.

References

1959 births
2016 deaths
People from Bender, Moldova
Soviet footballers
Ukrainian footballers
Ukrainian football managers
FC CSKA Kyiv players
FC Dnipro players
Ukraine women's national football team managers
FC Kryvbas Kryvyi Rih players
FC Ros Bila Tserkva players
FC Elektrometalurh-NZF Nikopol players
Moldovan emigrants to Ukraine
Association football defenders